Prolifico is an alternative real estate and private equity investment management firm based in Brazil. The company was founded in 2009 and is headquartered at São Paulo. It also operates out of Rio de Janeiro and London.

The company creates and manages investment vehicles in order to invest on real estate dependent business models on behalf of its investors.

History

Since the year 2009, when the company was founded, Prolifico has entered into a number of joint ventures to form operating business. The company operates on four different sectors:

 Self Storage
 Student Housing
 Senior Living
 Data Centers

The Self Storage operating company is jointly owned with the CEO and Founder of a top Europe’s self-storage operator Big Yellow. The Student Housing operating company was founded together with the ex-Head of Operations at UNITE and the Senior Living operating company is jointly owned with the former head of development and operations of over 400 care homes internationally for BUPA.

References

External links
Official website

Real estate companies of Brazil
Private equity firms of Brazil
Companies based in São Paulo